Herman Jurgens  ( – ) was a Dutch footballer. He was part of the Netherlands national football team, playing 2 matches. He played his first match on 29 March 1908.

See also
 List of Dutch international footballers

References

1884 births
1964 deaths
Dutch footballers
Netherlands international footballers
Sparta Rotterdam players
People from Capelle aan den IJssel
Association footballers not categorized by position
Footballers from South Holland